Thomas Coventry, 1st Earl of Coventry (ca. 162915 July 1699), became 5th Baron Coventry on the death of his nephew in 1687. He was created 1st Earl of Coventry in 1697. He was an English politician who sat in the House of Commons at various times between 1660 and 1687 when he succeeded to the peerage.

Early life
Thomas jnr., was the younger son of Thomas Coventry, 2nd Baron Coventry, and his wife Mary (née Craven). Thomas Coventry, 1st Baron Coventry, was his grandfather. In April 1660, he was elected Member of Parliament for Droitwich in the Convention Parliament. He was elected MP for Camelford in 1661 for the Cavalier Parliament. In 1681 he was elected MP for Warwick and was re-elected in 1685. He succeeded his nephew as fifth Baron Coventry in 1687 and entered the House of Lords. In 1697 he was made Viscount Deerhurst, of the hundred of Deerhurst in the County of Gloucester, and Earl of Coventry.

Marriages
Lord Coventry married firstly Winifred, daughter of Piers Edgecumbe of Mount Edgecumbe, Devon, circa 1660. She died on 11 June 1694 and was buried at St James's Church, Clerkenwell, London. 

He married secondly, on 16 July 1695, Elizabeth (b. July 1669), second daughter of Richard Grimes and his wife, Anne Perry. 

He died in July 1699 and was buried at St. Mary Magdalen Church, Croome D'Abitot, Worcestershire. He was succeeded in the earldom by his eldest son from his first marriage, Thomas. 

Lady Coventry remarried in May 1700, to Thomas Savage (1673–1742), Lord of Elmley Castle, Worcestershire, by whom she had two daughters, and died on 10 April 1724; buried in St.Mary's, Elmley Castle. The tomb is by William Stanton.

References

Kidd, Charles, Williamson, David (editors). Debrett's Peerage and Baronetage (1990 edition). New York: St Martin's Press, 1990.
]

1629 births
1699 deaths
Members of the Parliament of England for Warwick
Members of the Parliament of England for Camelford
Members of the Parliament of England for Droitwich
English MPs 1661–1679
English MPs 1681
English MPs 1685–1687
Year of birth uncertain
5
Earls of Coventry